M. Louise Stowell (1861 – 1930) was a painter, illustrator, craftsperson, and teacher in Rochester, New York.  She was born in Hornell, New York.  She was a student of the Art Students League of New York and of Arthur Wesley Dow.  Dow’s “preoccupation with Japanese art probably had an important influence on her career.”    In the mid-1890s, Stowell moved to Rochester and “quickly formed associations with the area’s leading artists.”  

In 1902 the Rochester Athenaeum and Mechanics Institute (now the Rochester Institute of Technology) decided to develop and expand the Decorative Arts and Crafts program by establishing an official department.  “During the next eight years the department expanded and evolved into the Department of Applied and Fine Arts which provided over ten programs of instruction.”    Stowell taught in the Mechanics Institute during the era of the Arts and Crafts movement for a number of years.  As faculty she “taught drawing, color, composition, and “Saturday classes.”  She worked closely with Harvey Ellis and Ada Howe Kent, and the three evolved a common watercolor style that was nourished by the Japanese aesthetic, often with mystical overtones and a symbolism that is reminiscent of the Pre-Raphaelites.”    “Beginning in 1903, the Mechanics Institute organized several important Arts and Crafts exhibitions in Rochester….”    
“Women in the nineteenth century often were taught fancy needlework and other home crafts as part of the preparation for the roles they were expected to assume as adults.  With the emergence of the Arts and Crafts movement, and its emphasis on handicrafts, women were provided an opportunity to exert an influence outside the home by participating in clubs, guilds, workshops, and exhibitions.  Many improved their economic status by becoming professional craftsmen.  … M. Louise Stowell… and countless other women across New York State figured prominently in both the theoretical and the practical aspects of the movement.”    Stowell helped organize the Rochester Arts and Crafts Society and was secretary on the executive committee when it was founded in 1897.  She was also a member of the New York Water Color Club.  Stowell wrote “important” articles for The Craftsman magazine.  “In October 1903… The Craftsman… published an article by Stowell entitled, “Japanese Prints and Some of Their Makers,” a comprehensive discussion of the aesthetics and techniques of Japanese art in which Stowell observed: “This art displays a respect for organic form, while not hesitating to sacrifice this for higher qualities of gracious line, well-disposed space and beautiful color which may be in separate patches and at variance with Occidental notions of veracity….”  

“Stowell was a practitioner of the applied arts, creating designs for posters, book illustrations, and murals.”    Her specialty was watercolor painting.  A collection of her work done on paper both in watercolor, pen and ink and in watercolor and pastel is kept at the Strong National Museum of Play, Rochester, New York.

References

Further reading

American women artists
1861 births
1930 deaths
Art Students League of New York alumni
People from Hornell, New York